Chalixodytes is a genus of sandburrowers native to the Indian and the Pacific oceans.

Species
There are currently two recognized species in this genus:
 Chalixodytes chameleontoculis J. L. B. Smith,  1957 (Sand dart)
 Chalixodytes tauensis L. P. Schultz, 1943 (Saddled sandburrower)

C. chameleontoculis is regarded by many authorities as a synonym of C. tauensis, which would mean that this genus is monotypic.

References

Creediidae
Marine fish genera
Taxa named by Leonard Peter Schultz